La jaula de oro (Spanish "the golden cage", not capitalized in Spanish) is a title which can refer to several works: 

 Jaula de Oro (album), 1984 album by Los Tigres del Norte
 "Jaula de oro" (song)
 La jaula de oro (1987 film), inspired by the song
 La jaula de oro (telenovela), a 1997 Mexican soap opera
 The Golden Dream (La jaula de oro in Spanish), film by Diego Quemada-Díez
 La jaula de oro, 1986 poetry collection by Altair Tejeda de Tamez

See also
 The Golden Cage (disambiguation)
 Cage of Gold